Gymnopilus picreus is a species of mushroom in the family Hymenogastraceae.

Description

Habitat and distribution
Gymnopilus picreus grows on conifer wood and sometimes on hardwood. It has been found in the northern United States, Canada, and Europe; fruiting in summer and autumn.

See also
List of Gymnopilus species

References

External links
Gymnopilus picreus at Index Fungorum

picreus
Fungi of North America